How Great Thou Art is a collaboration album by country singer Willie Nelson and his sister, Bobbie Nelson.

Track listing 
"How Great Thou Art" - 3:51
"Swing Low, Sweet Chariot" - 4:12
"It Is No Secret (What God Can Do)" - 5:17
"Kneel at the Feet of Jesus" - 2:34
"Just as I Am" - 3:40
"Just a Closer Walk With Thee" - 6:59
"Farther Along" - 5:21
"What a Friend We Have in Jesus" - 3:19
"In the Garden" - 5:05

Personnel 
Willie Nelson - Guitar, vocals
Jon Blondell - Bass
Bobbie Nelson - Piano

References

1997 albums
Willie Nelson albums